The Lexington Historical Society, founded in 1886 in Lexington, Massachusetts, preserves and celebrates Lexington's history, with a special emphasis on the town's important role in the beginning of the American Revolution. The Society presents entertaining and educational programs year-round in the restored Lexington Depot.  The Depot is available for rental by Lexington community groups, residents and businesses.

The Society manages three nationally historic house museums: the Hancock-Clarke House, Paul Revere's Lexington destination; Buckman Tavern, the gathering place of the Lexington militia on April 19, 1775; and Munroe Tavern, temporary British field headquarters during the retreat from Concord to Boston. Guided tours of these houses are available April through October, with tours by appointment during the off-season. An important part of the Society's mission is educational programs that focus on Colonial life and the American Revolution for elementary, middle and high school students.

The Society's offices are located at the restored Lexington Depot, located at 13 Depot Square in Lexington Centre.

The Society also maintains an extensive collection of artifacts and archives.  Many questions about Lexington history can be answered through research in the Society's Archives, a rich repository of documents, maps, photographs, and books.

Gallery

External links 
 Lexington Historical Society
 

Historical societies in Massachusetts
Massachusetts in the American Revolution
Lexington, Massachusetts
1886 establishments in Massachusetts